Chrystal may refer to:

 Crystal, of which it is an older, now non-standard, spelling
 Chrystal (film), a 2005 film

People with the surname
 Bob Chrystal (born 1930), Canadian ice hockey player
 George Chrystal (1851–1911), Scottish mathematician

People with the given name
 Chrystal Herne (1883–1950), actress
 Chrystal Soo Jung (or Krystal Jung; born 1994), American singer and actress based in South Korea

See also 
 Crystal (disambiguation)
 McChrystal